Return of the Texan is a 1952 American Western film directed by Delmer Daves and starring Dale Robertson and Joanne Dru.

Plot
After his wife dies, Sam Crockett honors her last wish by moving back to their native Texas with their two sons and Grandpa Firth. They have a farm there that is in serious disrepair.

Neighbor and old acquaintance Rod Murray has become owner of a large ranch by marrying Averill Marshall. He hates poachers and resents Grandpa hunting deer on his land. He also is unhappy that Averill's sister Ann, engaged to a doctor, is developing a romantic interest in Sam.

Sam needs money and does some fencing work for Rod, who is slow to pay him, leading to a fight. Grandpa suffers a stroke and Ann helps nurse him back to health. She knows that Sam still loves his late wife, but persuades him that they can begin a life of their own.

Cast
 Dale Robertson as Sam Crockett
 Joanne Dru as Ann Marshall
 Walter Brennan as Grandpa Firth Crockett
 Richard Boone as Rod Murray
 Tom Tully as Stud Spiller
 Robert Horton as Dr. Jim Harris
 Helen Westcott as Averill Murray
 Lonnie Thomas as Yo-Yo Crockett
 Dennis Ross as Steve Crockett

See also
 List of American films of 1952

References

External links
 
 
 

1952 Western (genre) films
1952 films
American Western (genre) films
American black-and-white films
Films directed by Delmer Daves
Films scored by Sol Kaplan
20th Century Fox films
Films with screenplays by Dudley Nichols
1950s English-language films
1950s American films